Kaks' tavallista Lahtista is a 1960 Finnish drama film directed by Ville Salminen. It was entered into the 10th Berlin International Film Festival.

Cast
 Eemeli as Janitor Vepsäläinen
 Vesa Enne as Janitor's son
 Hannu Halonen
 Paavo Hukkinen
 Pentti Irjala as Producer
 Leo Jokela as Champion's assistant
 Maija Karhi as Irma Virtanen
 Leni Katajakoski as Eeva
 Annikki Linnoila
 Oiva Luhtala
 Toivo Mäkelä as Managing clerk Puntti
 Pirkko Mannola as Pirkko Järvinen
 Aili Montonen
 Masa Niemi
 Tommi Rinne as Usko Lahtinen
 Ville-Veikko Salminen as European champion
 Pentti Viljanen
 Leif Wager as Toivo Lahtinen

References

External links

1960 films
1960s Finnish-language films
1960 drama films
Finnish black-and-white films
Films directed by Ville Salminen